This is a list of 108 species in Tanypus, a genus of midges in the family Chironomidae.

Tanypus species

 Tanypus albolineatus (Kieffer, 1910) c g
 Tanypus albus (Kieffer, 1924) c g
 Tanypus beringensis (Müller, 1924) c g
 Tanypus bicoloripennis Kieffer, 1917 c g
 Tanypus bilineata (Meigen, 1838) c g
 Tanypus bilobatus (Kieffer, 1910) c g
 Tanypus birmanensis (Kieffer, 1913) c g
 Tanypus brevipalpis (Kieffer, 1923) c
 Tanypus brooksi Gerry, 1933 c g
 Tanypus bruchi Kieffer, 1925 c g
 Tanypus castellanus (Strobl, 1900) c g
 Tanypus catemaco (Roback, 1964) c g
 Tanypus chinensis Wang, 1994 c g
 Tanypus ciliatus (Meigen, 1838) c g
 Tanypus cirratus Kieffer, 1925 c g
 Tanypus clavatus Beck, 1962 i c g
 Tanypus complanatus Saether, 2004 c g
 Tanypus concavus Roback, 1971 i c g
 Tanypus crassistylus Kieffer, 1925 c g
 Tanypus cvaneomaculatus (Doleschall, 1856) c g
 Tanypus debilis (Hutton, 1902) c g
 Tanypus distans (Kieffer, 1909) c
 Tanypus elegantulus (Wulp, 1874) c g
 Tanypus elongatus Kieffer, 1925 c g
 Tanypus excavatus Kieffer, 1925 c g
 Tanypus faeroensis (Kieffer, 1915) c
 Tanypus fasciatus (Meigen, 1804) c
 Tanypus fiebrigi Kieffer, 1917 c g
 Tanypus flaveolus (Williston, 1896) c g
 Tanypus flavidella (Vimmer, 1927) c g
 Tanypus formosanus (Kieffer, 1912) c
 Tanypus fraterculus (Lynch Arribalzaga, 1893) c g
 Tanypus fulvomaculipennis (Vimmer, 1927) c g
 Tanypus fulvonotata (Vimmer, 1927) c g
 Tanypus fusciclava (Kieffer, 1922) c
 Tanypus fuscofemoratus (Roser, 1840) c g
 Tanypus fuscus Freeman, 1955 c g
 Tanypus gracilis (Kieffer, 1918) c
 Tanypus gracillima (Kieffer, 1916) c g
 Tanypus grandis Chaudhuri, Das & Debnath, 1985 c g
 Tanypus gratus (Meigen, 1838) c g
 Tanypus grodhausi Coquillett, 1905 b
 Tanypus guttatipennis Goetghebuer, 1935 c g
 Tanypus himalayae (Kieffer, 1911) c g
 Tanypus hirsutus (Macquart, 1826) c g
 Tanypus imperialis Sublette, 1964 i c g
 Tanypus incarnatus (Meigen, 1830) c g
 Tanypus kraatzi (Kieffer, 1912) c g
 Tanypus lacustris (Kieffer, 1913) c g
 Tanypus languidus (Hutton, 1902) c g
 Tanypus laticalcar (Kieffer, 1918) c g
 Tanypus lauroi Serpa-Filho & Oliveira, 1922 c g
 Tanypus lenzi Spies & Reiss, 1966 c g
 Tanypus longiseta (Kieffer, 1924) c
 Tanypus lucidus Chaudhuri, Das & Debnath, 1985 c g
 Tanypus luteus (Gimmerthal, 1836) c g
 Tanypus macrochaeta (Kieffer, 1913) c g
 Tanypus maculatus (Macquart, 1826) c g
 Tanypus manilensis (Schiner, 1868) c g
 Tanypus masteri (Skuse, 1889) c g
 Tanypus melanurus (Doleschall, 1856) c g
 Tanypus memorosus (Meigen, 1804) c g
 Tanypus microcercus (Kieffer, 1910) c g
 Tanypus monotomus (Kieffer, 1924) c
 Tanypus murimus (Goetghebuer, 1923) c g
 Tanypus myrmedon Kieffer, 1917 c g
 Tanypus nakazatoi  g
 Tanypus neopunctipennis Sublette, 1964 i c g b
 Tanypus neotropicus Kieffer, 1917 c g
 Tanypus nigristilus (Kieffer, 1915) c g
 Tanypus nigrocinctus (Doleschall, 1856) c g
 Tanypus nubifer Coquillett, 1905 i c g
 Tanypus obscurus (Macquart, 1826) c g
 Tanypus pallidicornis (Zetterstedt, 1850) c g
 Tanypus pallidipes (Kieffer, 1912) c
 Tanypus parastellatus Sublette, 1964 i c g
 Tanypus pelargus Kieffer, 1917 c g
 Tanypus photophilus (Kieffer, 1910) c g
 Tanypus pictipennis (Vimmer, 1927) c g
 Tanypus prionotus (Kieffer, 1924) c g
 Tanypus pubitarsis (Zetterstedt, 1850) c
 Tanypus punctipennis Meigen, 1818 i c g b
 Tanypus quadripunctata (Vimmer, 1917) c g
 Tanypus riparius (Kieffer, 1911) c g
 Tanypus rufus (Meigen, 1830) c g
 Tanypus saltatrix (Kieffer, 1911) c g
 Tanypus schineri (Strobl, 1880) c g
 Tanypus scripta (Vimmer, 1917) c g
 Tanypus sexmaculata (Vimmer, 1927) c g
 Tanypus similima (Vimmer, 1927) c g
 Tanypus stellatus Coquillett, 1902 i c g
 Tanypus stictolabis (Kieffer, 1923) c g
 Tanypus sylvaticus (Meigen, 1804) c g
 Tanypus tanypodipennis (Zetterstedt, 1838) c g
 Tanypus telus Roback, 1971 i c g
 Tanypus tenebrosus Chaudhuri, Das & Debnath, 1985 c g
 Tanypus tenuis (Meigen, 1838) c g
 Tanypus tenuistylus Kieffer, 1925 c g
 Tanypus transversalis Kieffer, 1925 c g
 Tanypus tripunctata (Vimmer, 1927) c g
 Tanypus trisema (Kieffer, 1915) c g
 Tanypus unifascipennis (Zetterstedt, 1838) c g
 Tanypus unimaculata (Macquart, 1826) c g
 Tanypus vilipennis (Kieffer, 1918) i c
 Tanypus villipennis (Kieffer, 1918) c g
 Tanypus violaceipennis (Kieffer, 1910) c g
 Tanypus virdellus (Kieffer, 1924) c g
 Tanypus viridis (Meigen, 1804) c g

Data sources: i = ITIS, c = Catalogue of Life, g = GBIF, b = Bugguide.net

References

Tanypus